The Guangdong Olympic Centre Stadium or officially Aoti Main Stadium is a multi-purpose stadium in Guangzhou, People's Republic of China. Currently used mostly for football matches, the stadium was opened in 2001. It has a capacity of 80,012, making it the largest stadium in the country by seating capacity.

History
Guangdong Olympic Stadium broke ground on 31 December 1998 at the former site of Huangcun Airport. It opened to the public for the Ninth National Games of China in 2001. It was originally planned to help host the 2008 Summer Olympics until a decision was made to construct the National Stadium in Beijing. The original design for the Guangdong Olympic Stadium was announced in 1999. Taking Guangzhou's nickname, the Flower City, the American architectural firm of Ellerbe Becket designed Guangdong Olympic Stadium's sunscreen roof to resemble layers of petals on a flower. The design firm stated in its press release: "The stadium bowl grows out of the ground to a sculpted upper edge, like the petals of a flower. Floating above the bowl is a shimmering ribbon of roof flowing like a wave over the seats. It parts at the ends and holds the Olympic flame, suspended between the two ribbons. A hotel surrounds a circular opening in the roof that forms a vertical tower of light, which at night is visible for a great distance." The stadium's multi-colored seats are positioned in multiple sections that are visually connected via a ribbon pattern.

Major events
Guangzhou Pharmaceutical F.C. hosted the English Premier League champions Manchester United F.C. here on 27 July 2007.
Guangzhou Pharmaceutical F.C. hosted Chelsea F.C. on 23 July 2008 in Chelsea's first-ever trip to China.
The stadium hosted the athletics events of the 2010 Asian Games and 2010 Asian Para Games, as well as the opening and closing ceremonies of the 2010 Asian Para Games. The ceremonies for 2010 Asian Games were held at a stand at Haixinsha Island in the Tianhe District.

References

External links
Pictures of the Guangdong Olympic Stadium 
Architecture Week article about the stadium

Football venues in Guangzhou
Athletics (track and field) venues in China
Sports venues in Guangzhou
Stadiums of the Asian Games
Venues of the 2010 Asian Games
Asian Games athletics venues
Tianhe District
Multi-purpose stadiums in China
Sports venues completed in 2001